Profiles in Courage is an American historical anthology series that was telecast weekly on NBC from November 8, 1964, to May 9, 1965 (Sundays, 6:30-7:30pm, Eastern). The series was based on the  Pulitzer Prize winning 1956 book, Profiles in Courage by U.S. President John F. Kennedy, who had been assassinated the previous November.

Overview
The series lasted for 26 episodes, each of which would feature a figure from  American history who took an unpopular stand during a critical moment in the nation's history. Seven of the eight senators from Kennedy's book were profiled, with the exception being Mississippi's Lucius Quintus Cincinnatus Lamar. Music for the opening and closing theme was arranged by Nelson Riddle, based on the Irish ballad, The Boys of Wexford, home of Kennedy's ancestors.

Historical background

Episodes

Awards
The series won two awards; a Peabody Award for Robert Saudek and a Directors Guild of America Award for Outstanding Directorial Achievement in Television.

External links
 
Profiles in Courage at CTVA with episode list

Episodes of Profiles in Courage on the Internet Archive
 Episode 6, John Slaton
 Episode 11, John Peter Altgeld
 Episode 13, Daniel Webster
 Episode 21, Grover Cleveland
 Episode 22, John Quincy Adams
 Episode 24, ''Ben B. Lindsay"
 Episode 25, George Mason

References

1964 American television series debuts
1965 American television series endings
1960s American anthology television series
Black-and-white American television shows
English-language television shows
Historical television series
NBC original programming
Peabody Award-winning television programs
Television shows based on non-fiction books
Cultural depictions of John Adams
Cultural depictions of John Quincy Adams
Cultural depictions of presidents of the United States
Cultural depictions of Woodrow Wilson
Cultural depictions of Grover Cleveland
Cultural depictions of Frederick Douglass
Cultural depictions of Andrew Johnson